Dubău (Dubove, Dubovo) is a commune in the Dubăsari District of Transnistria, Moldova. It is composed of two villages, Dubău and Goianul Nou (Нові Гояни, Новые Гояны). It has since 1990 been administered as a part of the breakaway Pridnestrovian Moldavian Republic (PMR).

References

Communes of Transnistria
Kherson Governorate
Dubăsari District, Transnistria